Kelman is a surname. Notable people with the surname include:

 Alfred R. Kelman (born 1936), American film and television documentary producer and director
 Ari Kelman (born 1968), Chancellor’s Leadership Professor of History at University of California, Davis
 Charles Kelman (1930–2004), ophthalmologist and a pioneer in cataract surgery
 Charlie Kelman (born 2001), American professional soccer player
 Emile Kelman, record producer and audio engineer
 Herbert Kelman, the Richard Clarke Cabot Professor of Social Ethics, Emeritus at Harvard University
 James Kelman (born 1946), influential writer of novels, short stories, plays and political essays
 John Kelman (born 1968), Barbadian boxer
 Mark Kelman (born 1951), jurist and vice dean of Stanford Law School
 Moshe Kelman, the operational commander of the Palmach's Third Battalion in 1948
 Naamah Kelman (born 1955), American-born Rabbi, Dean of the Hebrew Union College-Jewish Institute of Religion campus
 Nic Kelman (born 1971), writer of novels, short stories, non-fiction, screenplays, and essays
 Pat Kelman, British director, writer and actor
 Peggy Kelman, Australian pioneer aviator
 Ricky Kelman (born 1950), American actor
 Scott Kelman (born 1981), Canadian ice hockey player
 Stephen Kelman, English novelist, whose debut novel Pigeon English was a shortlisted nominee for the 2011 Man Booker Prize
 Thomas Kelman Fleming, CVO OBE FRSAMD (1927–2010), Scottish actor, director, poet, television and radio commentator for the BBC
 Todd Kelman (born 1975), retired Canadian ice hockey defenceman
 Wolfe Kelman (1923–1990), Austrian-born American Rabbi and leader in the Conservative Judaism in the United States

See also 
 Kelman Ltd., Northern Ireland based company that produces advanced monitoring and diagnostics technologies for large electrical transformers
 Kelman's source characteristics, three characteristics of successful marketing communications sources

References